The Biblical Theology Bulletin is a quarterly peer-reviewed academic journal that publishes articles and book reviews in the fields of biblical studies and, to a lesser extent, theology. The journal was established in 1971 under the editorship of Leopold Sabourin (Pontifical Biblical Institute). According to Michael Gorman, the journal is "devoted primarily to social-scientific perspectives."

Abstracting and indexing 
The journal is abstracted and indexed in:
 Academic Onefile
 Academic Complete
 Scopus
 ZETOC

References

External links 

Biblical studies journals
SAGE Publishing academic journals
Publications established in 1973
English-language journals
Quarterly journals